Nombe is an extinct genus of macropodid containing a single species, Nombe nombe, which was formerly classified as a member of the related genus Protemnodon. It was native to New Guinea during the Late Pleistocene.

References

Macropods